MiG-29: Soviet Fighter is a shoot 'em up game developed by Codemasters in 1989 and released for several contemporary home computers. An unlicensed version was also released for the Nintendo Entertainment System by Camerica.

Gameplay
The player plays the role of a Soviet MiG-29 fighter pilot. The object of the game is to defeat the World Terrorist Army. It is similar in style to After Burner. MiG-29 cartridges have a small switch in the back to make the game compatible with U.S. and European systems.

Development
The original version of the game was written for the ZX Spectrum by Richard Chaney while he was a pupil at Wolfreton School, Hull, UK. Updated graphics and sound were later added by Codemasters. The ten names on the high score table are pupils in Richard's form at the school, giving away the game's home-grown origins.

References

External links
 
 

1989 video games
Amiga games
Amstrad CPC games
Atari ST games
Codemasters games
Commodore 64 games
Unauthorized video games
Nintendo Entertainment System games
Single-player video games
Video games scored by Allister Brimble
ZX Spectrum games
Video games developed in the United Kingdom
Camerica games